Balrog Macula  is the largest of the "Brass Knuckles", a series of equatorial dark regions on Pluto.

It is the largest dark equatorial feature on Pluto after the Cthulhu Macula, and is located in the middle of the leading hemisphere.

It is named after the balrogs, a race of demons in the fiction of J. R. R. Tolkien.

References

Regions of Pluto
Extraterrestrial surface features named for Middle-earth